OLT Express Germany (formerly OLT Ostfriesische Lufttransport GmbH or OLT) was an airline based in Bremen in Germany. The company moved to Bremen from Emden in February 2012. It operated regional scheduled and charter flights linking northern Germany to other parts of the country and Bremen to other European destinations. Its main base was Bremen Airport.

History

Founding and first years
OLT was founded on 1 November 1958 by Martin Dekker and Jan Janssen as Ostfriesische Lufttaxi - Dekker und Janssen OHG, initially operating air taxi flights to islands in the North Sea from Emden. The first aircraft was a KZ VII from Skandinavisk Aero Industri A/S in Copenhagen. In 1961 the airline hired its first own staff: a pilot and a 'groundstewardess'.

OLT had, by 1968, five aircraft and operated 13,174 flights. After Janssen's death the company AGIV (Aktiengesellschaft für Verkehrswesen) and the shipping company Reederei Visser & van Doornums became 1970 new shareholders and the airlines was renamed into Ostfriesische Lufttaxi GmbH. A schedule service from Emden to Bremen and Hamburg was introduced then. Soon later AGIV became the single shareholder of OLT and positioned the new CEO Christian Ulrich Baron von Kaltenborn-Stachau.

39 Years of operation as OLT - Ostfriesische Lufttransport

In 1972 the airlines was renamed again, now into Ostfriesische Lufttransport GmbH (OLT) and Kaltenborn-Stachau took over 26%. Several new schedule services were introduced like from Kassel, Düsseldorf to Cologne/Bonn in 1973 and Hanover, Saarbrücken, Stuttgart, Münster/Osnabrück and Frankfurt in 1974. For the regional airlines business strategy the company DLT (Deutsche Lufttransport-Gesellschaft mbH) was created and OLT was renamed into DLT Luftverkehrsgesellschaft. But soon later AGIV decided to split the Emden (OLT) operation away from DLT. This unit (Emden operation) was sold then to AG EMS and OLT restart its old core activities under its own name. To ensure a flexible operation, especially in the charter sector, OLT organised 1976 a joint platform called OFD with the participating airlines OLT, FLN and Dollart GmbH.

At the beginning 1990s, with the fall of the Berlin Wall, the airlines faced an increase of their business activities. OLT started operations in the former East German provinces and 1990 took over Roland Air from Bremen. In 1991 OLT set up a base in Bremen and started with its scheduled services there. In 1996 all OFD activities were integrated into OLT and therefore under the control of AG EMS.

OLT is one of very few airlines that has succeeded in driving a low-cost rival off a route. In December 2005, easyJet started daily flights between Bristol and its base in Hamburg. OLT was operating twice-daily weekday-only services. The route being a predominantly business route, frequency won out over price and easyJet cancelled the route at the end of October 2006.

OLT Express Germany
OLT announced on 4 August 2011 it would undergo major restructuring after losing its shuttle flights contract with Airbus Industries. Effective October 2011 all Fokker and Saab aircraft operations would stop and 100 of its 120 employees were to leave the company. Only the 'island-hopping' services from Emden to Heligoland and Borkum with small aircraft were to remain. In August 2011, OLT was bought by a Polish shadow banking Ponzi scheme company Amber Gold, which also bought Polish regional carrier Jet Air and the Polish charter airline Yes Airways. These two Polish companies were combined under the brand OLT Express while OLT became OLT Express Germany. The island flights were taken over by a new independent company, OFD Ostfriesischer-Flug-Dienst.

OLT Express Germany completed the purchase of Contact Air in September 2012. The purchase included Contact Air's wet-lease contract to operate two aircraft on behalf of Swiss International Air Lines. The same week as the Contact Air purchase Amber Gold was reported to be experiencing financial difficulty and funding for the deal was in question. On 27 July, the Polish OLT Express suspended all services without notice.

In August 2012 Dutch company Panta Holdings announced it was buying OLT Germany from Amber Gold and also finalised the purchase of Contact Air. Panta also owns Denim Air and Maas Air Leasing. Both subsidiaries own Fokker aircraft and Maas leased out two Fokker 100 to Contact Air. In December 2012 it was announced that the wet-lease contract with Swiss International Air Lines would not be renewed and was scheduled to conclude in March 2013.

OLT Express Germany ceased all operations on 27 January 2013 due to financial difficulties. The company filed for bankruptcy two days later.

Destinations
OLT operated the following services. Note that all island flights had been transferred to the independent company OFD Ostfriesischer-Flug-Dienst back in 2011.

Operated as OLT Express Germany
 
 Vienna - Vienna International Airport seasonal
 
 Copenhagen - Copenhagen Airport
 
 Toulouse - Toulouse-Blagnac Airport
 
 Bremen - Bremen Airport Hub
 Dresden - Dresden Airport
 Hamburg - Hamburg Airport
 Karlsruhe - Baden Airpark
 Münster - Münster Osnabrück Airport 
 Munich - Munich Airport
 Saarbrücken - Saarbrücken Airport Hub
 
 Zurich - Zurich Airport
 
 London - London Southend Airport

Operated for Swiss International Air Lines
 
 Stuttgart - Stuttgart Airport
 Munich - Munich Airport 
 
 Budapest - Budapest Ferenc Liszt International Airport 
 
 Warsaw - Warsaw Chopin Airport 
 
 Belgrade - Belgrade Nikola Tesla Airport 
 
 Zurich - Zurich Airport Base

Fleet

 the OLT Express Germany fleet consisted of the following aircraft:

References

External links

 Official website

Defunct airlines of Germany
European Regions Airline Association
Airlines established in 1958
Airlines disestablished in 2013
1958 establishments in West Germany
German companies established in 1958
German companies disestablished in 2013